Gillview is a suburb of Johannesburg, South Africa. It is located in Region F of the City of Johannesburg Metropolitan Municipality.

History
The suburb is situated on an old Witwatersrand farm of Turffontein. It was proclaimed as a suburb on 27 November 1963 and is named after the lands developer, Gilbert 'Gill' Tunmer and view of the valley.

References

Johannesburg Region F